The M3 is an urban motorway 0.8 miles (1.3 km) in length owned by Siac Construction and Cintra, S.A. that connects the M2 in north Belfast, Northern Ireland to the A2 Sydenham Bypass in east Belfast. It is the shortest motorway in Northern Ireland, and one of the busiest, carrying 60,000 vehicles per day as of 2005. It has a permanent speed limit of 50 mph (80 km/h).

History
The M3 was originally planned in 1956 as the Eastern Approach, named the M3 the following year, which would run from east Belfast to Bangor. The plan was extended to include an orbital Belfast Urban Motorway, close to the city centre, in 1964. Due to a combination of financial cutbacks and public opposition construction of the M3 never took place and the Belfast Urban Motorway was downgraded to the A12 Westlink dual-carriageway and only partially completed. Traffic had to make do with crossing the River Lagan on the Queen's Bridge and using the A2 to Bangor.

In 1987 the government announced a plan to build a new bridge across the Lagan connecting the M2 directly to the A2. It was built in two stages: the Lagan Bridge section connecting to the M2 opened on 22 January 1995 while the link to the A2 opened three years later in May 1998. The route was designated as the M3, although it is not the same scheme as the one originally expected to be the M3. Construction of this road was unusual as government policy was against the construction of new urban motorways.

Junctions

M3 Lagan Bridge 
The M3 crosses the River Lagan on a 160m-long, 37m-wide arched concrete bridge. This bridge is actually two separate, parallel spans, made of pre-cast segments.

See also
Roads in Ireland
List of motorways in the United Kingdom

References

External links

CBRD Motorway Database – M3 (Northern Ireland)
Northern Ireland Roads Site
M3
Belfast Urban Motorway
The Motorway Archive – M3 (Northern Ireland)
 

3-0003
3-0003
Lagan Bridge